The 2020 Pocono Green 225, branded as the Pocono Green 225 Recycled by J.P. Mascaro & Sons, was a NASCAR Xfinity Series race held on June 28, 2020 at Pocono Raceway in Long Pond, Pennsylvania. Contested over 91 laps—extended from 90 laps due to an overtime finish—on the  triangular racecourse, it was the 12th race of the 2020 NASCAR Xfinity Series season and the season's fourth and final Dash 4 Cash race. Chase Briscoe won his fourth race of the season.

Report

Background 

The race was held at Pocono Raceway, which is a three-turn superspeedway located in Long Pond, Pennsylvania. The track hosts two Cup Series races: the Pocono Organics 325 and the Pocono 350, as well as one Xfinity Series and Gander RV & Outdoors Truck Series event. Since 2013, the track is also host to a NTT IndyCar Series race.

Pocono Raceway is one of a very few NASCAR tracks not owned by either Speedway Motorsports, Inc. or International Speedway Corporation. It is operated by the Igdalsky siblings Brandon, Nicholas, and sister Ashley, and cousins Joseph IV and Chase Mattioli, all of whom are third-generation members of the family-owned Mattco Inc, started by Joseph II and Rose Mattioli.

The race was held without fans in attendance due to the ongoing COVID-19 pandemic.

Dash 4 Cash 
The Dash 4 Cash is a series of four races in the NASCAR Xfinity Series, preceded by a qualifying race. The top four points-eligible drivers in the previous race are eligible to win a $100,000 bonus on top of their race winnings if they win the race. Cup Series regulars are not permitted to compete in the races.

The Pocono Green 225 was the season's fourth and final Dash 4 Cash race. Ross Chastain, Austin Cindric, Justin Haley, and Alex Labbé were eligible to win after being the top 4 points-eligible drivers at the Unhinged 300 that were driving in this race.†

† - Jeb Burton, Brett Moffitt, Anthony Alfredo, and Gray Gaulding all finished ahead of Alex Labbé at Talladega, but were either not eligible for Xfinity Series points or not entered into this race.

Entry list 

 (R) denotes rookie driver.
 (i) denotes driver who is ineligible for series driver points.

Qualifying 
Noah Gragson was awarded the pole for the race as determined by a random draw.

Starting Lineup 

 . – Eligible for Dash 4 Cash prize money.
 The No. 0 and No. 07 had to start from the rear due to unapproved adjustments.

Race

Race results

Stage Results 
Stage One

Laps: 20

Stage Two

Laps: 20

Final Stage Results 
Laps: 50

 . – Won the Dash 4 Cash prize money.

Race statistics 

 Lead changes: 12 among 6 different drivers
 Cautions/Laps: 9 for 31
 Red flags: 1
 Time of race: 2 hours, 5 minutes, 44 seconds
 Average speed:

Media

Television 
The Pocono Green 225 was carried by FS1 in the United States. Adam Alexander, Jamie McMurray, and Regan Smith called the race from the Fox Sports Studio in Charlotte, with Matt Yocum covering pit road.

Radio 
The Motor Racing Network (MRN) called the race for radio, which was simulcast on SiriusXM NASCAR Radio.

Standings after the race 

 Drivers' Championship standings

 Note: Only the first 12 positions are included for the driver standings.
 . – Driver has clinched a position in the NASCAR playoffs.

References 

2020 NASCAR Xfinity Series
2020 in sports in Pennsylvania
Pocono Green 225
NASCAR races at Pocono Raceway